The October 1974 United Kingdom general election took place on Thursday 10 October 1974 to elect 635 members of the British House of Commons. It was the second general election held that year, the first year that two general elections were held in the same year since 1910, and the first time that two general elections were held less than a year apart from each other since the 1923 and 1924 elections, which took place 10 months apart. The election resulted in the Labour Party led by Prime Minister Harold Wilson winning a bare majority of just 3 seats. This enabled the remainder of the Labour government, 1974–1979 to take place, which saw a gradual loss of its majority.

The election of February that year had produced an unexpected hung parliament. Coalition talks between the Conservatives and other parties such as the Liberals and the Ulster Unionists failed, allowing Wilson to form a minority government. The October campaign was not as vigorous or exciting as the one in February. Despite continuing high inflation, Labour was able to boast that it had ended the miners' strike, which had dogged Heath's premiership, and had returned some stability. The Conservative Party, still led by former Prime Minister Edward Heath, released a manifesto promoting national unity; however, its chances of forming a government were hindered by the Ulster Unionist Party refusing to take the Conservative whip at Westminster, in response to the Sunningdale Agreement of 1973.

The Conservatives and the Liberals each saw their vote share decline, and Conservative Party leader Edward Heath, who had lost three of the four elections he contested, was ousted as party leader in February 1975 and replaced with future Prime Minister Margaret Thatcher. The Scottish National Party won 30% of the Scottish popular vote and 11 of Scotland's 71 seats; it was their most successful general election result until 2015.

Subsequently, Labour's narrow parliamentary majority had disappeared by 1977 through a series of by-election losses and defections. It then required deals with the Liberals, the Ulster Unionists, the Scottish Nationalists and the Welsh Nationalists.

This was the last general election victory for the Labour Party until 1997; each of the next four consecutive general elections produced a Conservative parliamentary majority. It would also be the last time Labour won more seats at a national election than the Conservatives until the 1989 European Parliament election.

The election was broadcast live on the BBC, and was presented by David Butler, Alastair Burnet, Robert McKenzie, Robin Day and Sue Lawley.

Campaign
The brief period between the elections gave Wilson the opportunity to demonstrate reasonable progress. Despite high inflation and high balance-of-trade deficits, the miners' strike that had dogged Heath was over and some stability had been restored. Following the February election Heath had remained largely out of the public eye.

As was expected, the campaign was not as exciting as the one in February and overall coverage by broadcasters was significantly scaled back. The Conservatives campaigned on a manifesto of national unity, in response to the mood of the public. Labour campaigned on its recent successes in government, and although the party was divided over Europe, their strengths outweighed that of Heath, who knew his future relied on an election victory. Devolution was a key issue for the Liberals and the Scottish National Party, and was now one that the two main parties also felt the need to address. The Liberals did not issue a new manifesto, simply reissuing the one they had created for the last election.

Timeline
Prime Minister Harold Wilson made a ministerial broadcast on television on 18 September to announce that the election would be held on 10 October, less than eight months since the previous election. The key dates were as follows:

Results
Labour achieved a swing of 2% against the Conservatives. This was the first time since 1922 that a government had won an overall majority with less than 40% of the vote, albeit a majority of only 3. The Conservatives won just under 36% of the vote, their worst share since 1918; and a slight drop in the Liberal vote saw them suffer a net loss of 1 seat. In Scotland, the SNP added another 4 seats to their successes in the previous election to become the 4th largest party. Turnout was 72.8%, which was a significant decline on the February election's 78.8% turnout.

|-
|+ style="caption-side: bottom; font-weight:normal" |All parties shown.
|}

Votes summary

Seats summary

Incumbents defeated

See also
 Labour government, 1974–1979
 List of MPs elected in the October 1974 United Kingdom general election
 October 1974 United Kingdom general election in Northern Ireland

Notes

References

Further reading

External links
United Kingdom election results—summary results 1885–1979

Manifestos
Putting Britain First, October 1974 Conservative Party manifesto
Britain Will Win With Labour, October 1974 Labour Party manifesto
Why Britain Needs Liberal Government, October 1974 Liberal Party manifesto

 
General elections to the Parliament of the United Kingdom
General election
October 1974 events in the United Kingdom
Harold Wilson
Edward Heath